The 1971–72 NBA season was the Celtics' 26th season in the NBA. The Celtics qualified for the playoffs for the first time in 3 seasons, and won the Atlantic Division for the 1st time in franchise history. The Celtics had the fifth best team defensive rating and the fifth best team offensive rating in the NBA.

Draft picks

Roster

Regular season

z = clinched division title
y = clinched division title
x = clinched playoff spot

Record vs. opponents

Game log

Playoffs

|- align="center" bgcolor="#ccffcc"
| 1
| March 29
| Atlanta
| W 126–108
| John Havlicek (32)
| Dave Cowens (16)
| John Havlicek (10)
| Boston Garden12,815
| 1–0
|- align="center" bgcolor="#ffcccc"
| 2
| March 31
| @ Atlanta
| L 104–113
| John Havlicek (43)
| Dave Cowens (12)
| John Havlicek (4)
| Alexander Memorial Coliseum6,955
| 1–1
|- align="center" bgcolor="#ccffcc"
| 3
| April 2
| Atlanta
| W 136–113
| John Havlicek (31)
| Cowens, Finkel (11)
| Jo Jo White (11)
| Boston Garden12,094
| 2–1
|- align="center" bgcolor="#ffcccc"
| 4
| April 4
| @ Atlanta
| L 110–112
| Jo Jo White (32)
| Steve Kuberski (13)
| John Havlicek (5)
| Alexander Memorial Coliseum7,192
| 2–2
|- align="center" bgcolor="#ccffcc"
| 5
| April 7
| Atlanta
| W 124–114
| John Havlicek (27)
| Dave Cowens (12)
| John Havlicek (9)
| Boston Garden15,315
| 3–2
|- align="center" bgcolor="#ccffcc"
| 6
| April 9
| @ Atlanta
| W 127–118
| Havlicek, Cowens (26)
| Dave Cowens (20)
| Jo Jo White (9)
| Alexander Memorial Coliseum7,192
| 4–2
|-

|- align="center" bgcolor="#ffcccc"
| 1
| April 13
| New York
| L 94–116
| Jo Jo White (19)
| Dave Cowens (15)
| Jo Jo White (5)
| Boston Garden14,292
| 0–1
|- align="center" bgcolor="#ffcccc"
| 2
| April 16
| @ New York
| L 105–106
| John Havlicek (29)
| Dave Cowens (18)
| John Havlicek (6)
| Madison Square Garden19,588
| 0–2
|- align="center" bgcolor="#ccffcc"
| 3
| April 19
| New York
| W 115–109
| Jo Jo White (29)
| Dave Cowens (16)
| John Havlicek (11)
| Boston Garden15,315
| 1–2
|- align="center" bgcolor="#ffcccc"
| 4
| April 21
| @ New York
| L 98–116
| John Havlicek (27)
| Havlicek, Nelson (9)
| John Havlicek (6)
| Madison Square Garden19,588
| 1–3
|- align="center" bgcolor="#ffcccc"
| 5
| April 23
| New York
| L 103–111
| John Havlicek (32)
| Dave Cowens (15)
| Jo Jo White (9)
| Boston Garden15,315
| 1–4
|-

Awards and records
John Havlicek, All-NBA First Team
John Havlicek, NBA All-Defensive First Team
Don Chaney, NBA All-Defensive Second Team

References

Boston Celtics
Boston Celtics seasons
Boston Celtics
Boston Celtics
Celtics
Celtics